The Roman Catholic Diocese of Mamfe is a diocese located in the city of Mamfe in the Ecclesiastical province of Bamenda in Cameroon.

History
 February 9, 1999: Established as Diocese of Mamfe from Diocese of Buéa

Special churches
The cathedral is St. Joseph's Cathedral in Mamfe.

Bishops
 Bishops of Mamfe (Roman rite)
 Bishop Francis Teke Lysinge (February 9, 1999  – January 25, 2014)
 Bishop Andrew Nkea Fuanya (January 25, 2014  – December 30, 2019), appointed Archbishop of Bamenda
 Bishop Aloysius Fondong Abangalo (February 22, 2022 - )

Coadjutor bishop
Andrew Nkea Fuanya (2013-2014)

See also
Roman Catholicism in Cameroon

References

External links
 GCatholic.org

Roman Catholic dioceses in Cameroon
Christian organizations established in 1999
Roman Catholic dioceses and prelatures established in the 20th century
1999 establishments in Cameroon
Roman Catholic Ecclesiastical Province of Bamenda